WCSI (1010 AM) is a commercial radio station in Columbus, Indiana.  It broadcasts a talk radio format and is owned by White River Broadcasting Co., Inc.  The radio studios and offices are on Washington Street in Columbus, near National Road.  

WCSI is limited in its power because 1010 AM is a clear channel frequency reserved for Canada.  By day WCSI broadcasts at 330 watts and at night it reduces power to 18 watts.  Programming is also heard on 250 watt FM translator W251CK at 98.1 MHz.

Programming
On weekdays, WCSI begins with a local news and talk show, "AM Columbus with John Foster."  The rest of the weekday schedule is made up of nationally syndicated radio hosts:  Brian Kilmeade, Dan Bongino, "The Ramsey Show with Dave Ramsey," Joe Pags, Jim Bohannon, "Coast to Coast AM with George Noory" and "This Morning, America's First News with Gordon Deal."  

On weekends, specialty shows are heard including "Digital Goddess Kim Komando," "Leo Laporte, The Tech Guy," "Bill Handel on the Law," "Somewhere in Time with Art Bell" and "Sunday Night Live with Bill Cunningham."  Most hours begin with an update from Fox News Radio.

History
In , WCSI signed on the air.  It was originally a daytimer, powered at 250 watts and required to go off the air at sunset.  It was owned by Syndicate Theaters, Inc.  Its offices and studios were on Third Street in Columbus.

An FM station was added in 1958, WCSI-FM (now WKKG).  Originally WCSI-FM simulcast the AM station's full service adult contemporary format.  But in the 1970s, it switched to country music.

References

External links

CSI